Julio Gutiérrez García (born in Madrid) is a track and field athlete from Spain.  He has a vision impairment and is B2/T12 type athlete. He competed at the 1976 Summer Paralympics, winning silver in the long jump.

References

External links 
 
 

Year of birth missing (living people)
Living people
Spanish male long jumpers
Spanish disability athletes
Visually impaired long jumpers
Paralympic athletes of Spain
Paralympic silver medalists for Spain
Paralympic medalists in athletics (track and field)
Athletes (track and field) at the 1976 Summer Paralympics
Medalists at the 1976 Summer Paralympics
Athletes from Madrid
Paralympic long jumpers